New Medicines is the second album by Dead Poetic. Released April 6, 2004 through Solid State Records and Tooth & Nail Records. On June 28, 2004 it was released in the UK by Golf Records and Plastic Head Distribution.

Track listing

Writing credits
All music written by Dead Poetic.
All lyrics written by Brandon Rike.

Personnel
 Brandon Rike - Vocals
 Zach Miles - Lead Guitar
 Chad Shellabarger - Bass
 Jesse Sprinkle - Drums
 Todd Osborn - Rhythm Guitar
 Aaron Sprinkle - Production, engineering, keyboards (on Dimmer Light)
 Zach Hodges - Engineering, piano (on Zonshine)
 Troy Glessner - Mastering
 Phil Peterson - Cello (on Dimmer Light)

References

Dead Poetic albums
2004 albums
Tooth & Nail Records albums
Albums produced by Aaron Sprinkle
Solid State Records albums